Yoko and  are Japanese feminine given names. Yōko is sometimes transliterated as Yohko and Youko.

The name Yoko is almost always written with the kanji  (ko), meaning "child". The syllable ko is not generally found at the end of masculine names.

In Japanese, Yoko and Yōko have numerous orthographical variations. Some of the meanings of the kanji used to write it are:

瑛子, "crystal, sparkle of jewelry, child"
陽子, "sunshine, child", "sunny, child"
洋子, "ocean, child"
遥子, "long ago, child"
楊子, "willow, child"
瑶子, "beautiful, child"
謡子, "noh (Japanese word for skill or talent), child"
八子, "eight, child"
羊子, "sheep, child"
要子, "vital, need, child"
暢子, "free, child"
容子, "glorious, child"
妖子, "bewitch, child"
葉子, "leaf, child"
曜子, "weekday, child"

The masculine name Yōkō, as in the given name of pro boxer , is transliterated similarly, but in Japanese it is written and pronounced differently.

People
Yoko Akino (暢子, born 1957), Japanese actress
Yōko Asada (葉子, born 1969), Japanese voice actress
, Japanese speed skater
, Japanese lawyer
Yoko Hikasa (陽子, born 1985), Japanese voice actress
Yōko Honna (陽子 born 1979), Japanese voice actress
Yoko Ishida (born 1973), Japanese singer
Yōko Ishino (ようこ born 1968), Japanese actress and tarento
, Japanese volleyball player
Yoko Kamio (葉子, born 1966), manga artist popular for her manga Boys Over Flowers
Yoko Kando (陽子, born 1974), Japanese butterfly swimmer
Yoko Kanno (よう子, born 1964), composer-keyboardist
Yoko Kato (born 1952), Japanese neurosurgeon
Yoko Koikawa (born 1974), Japanese backstroke swimmer
Yoko Kumada (熊田 曜子, born 1982), Japanese gravure idol and singer
Yōko Maki (actress) (よう子, born 1982), Japanese actress
Yōko Maki (manga artist) (ようこ, born 1981), Japanese Manga artist
Yoko Matsugane (洋子, born 1982), Japanese gravure idol
Yōko Matsuoka (松岡洋子, born 1954), Japanese voice actress
Yoko Matsuyama (松山容子, born 1937), Japanese actress
Yoko Minamida (南田 洋子, 1933–2009), a Japanese actress
Yoko Minamino (陽子, born 1967), Japanese actress and singer
Yoko Mori (瑤子, 1940–1993), Japanese novelist
Yoko Moriguchi (瑤子, born 1966), Japanese actress
Yōko Nagayama (洋子, born 1968), Japanese enka singer and actress
Yōko Natsuki (陽子, born 1952), Japanese actress
Yōko Nogiwa (陽子, born 1936), Japanese actress
Yoko Ono (洋子, born 1933), Japanese musician-artist and widow of John Lennon. She now writes her name in katakana (オノ・ヨーコ/Ono Yōko)
, Japanese judoka
Yoko Sakaue (坂上, born 1968), Japanese judoka
, Japanese voice actress and actress
Yoko Shibui (陽子, born 1979), Japanese long-distance runner
Yoko Shimada (楊子, 1953–2022), Japanese actress
Yoko Shimomura (陽子, born 1967), Japanese composer and musician
Yoko Shindo (真道 洋子, 19602018), Japanese archaeologist
Yōko Sōmi (陽子, born 1965), Japanese voice actress
Yoko Takahashi (洋子, born 1966), Japanese singer, performed "Cruel Angel's Thesis" opening for Neon Genesis Evangelion
Yoko Tanabe (陽子, born 1966), Japanese judoka
, Japanese women's footballer
Yoko Tawada (葉子, born 1960), Japanese writer
Yoko Toyonaga (born 1977), Japanese shot putter
Yoko Wanibuchi (洋子, born 1972), Japanese politician
Yoko Watanabe (葉子, 1953–2004), Japanese operatic soprano
Yoko Kawashima Watkins
, Japanese mixed martial artist
, Japanese lyricist and writer
, Japanese actress
, Japanese swimmer

Fictional characters
Yoko Akimoku, a character from manga and anime Biriken
Yoko Nakajima, a character in The Twelve Kingdoms
Yoko Nakashima, a character in Ultraman Z
Yoko Belnades, a supporting character in the Castlevania series.
Yoko Herene, a character in 'My-OtomeYoko Katagiri, a character Kidou Keiji JibanYoko Kuno, a character All About Lily Chou-ChouYoko Littner, one of the main characters of Tengen Toppa Gurren LagannYoko Machi, a character in Bokurano: Ours
Yoko Matsutani, a character in LegendzYohko Mano, the title character of Devil Hunter YohkoYoko Minato, a character in Kamen Rider GaimYoko Okino, a minor character in Detective ConanYōko Ozawa, a character in Love ExposureYoko Tsuno (character), the title character of the Yoko Tsuno comic book series created by Belgian writer Roger Leloup.
Yoko Suzuki, a character in the Resident Evil series
Yoko Shiragami, the female main protagonist of My Monster SecretYoko Usami, a main character in Tokumei Sentai Go-BustersYoko, a character in Inukami!Yoko, a character in the 2004 film The GrudgeYoko, the birth name of the main character in the manga Gunnm.
Yoko Kurama, a form of the character Kurama in the animated series YuYu Hakusho''
Yoko Harmageddon from the Street Fighter video game series
Yoko Katou, a character in the Himitsu Sentai Gorenger
Yoko, a character in the Mojin: The Lost Legend
Yoko Inokuma, a character in KINMOZA!
Yoko, a character in Timothy Goes to School

References

Japanese feminine given names